William Marshall (11 July 1936 – 20 April 2007) was a Northern Irish professional footballer who played as a full back. He played in the Football League for Burnley, Oldham Athletic and Hartlepools United.

He won two caps for the Northern Ireland B national football team between 1958 and 1960. He died on 20 April 2007, following a short illness.

References

1936 births
2007 deaths
Association footballers from Belfast
Association footballers from Northern Ireland
Northern Ireland B international footballers
Association football defenders
Burnley F.C. players
Oldham Athletic A.F.C. players
Hartlepool United F.C. players
English Football League players